PETREL (Platform for Extra and Terrestrial Remote Examination with LCTF) is a technology demonstration satellite being developed by Tokyo Institute of Technology. The microsatellite is equipped with a multispectral camera, which will be used to carry out two distinct missions. One mission is to survey the sky in ultraviolet wavelengths for the field of time-domain astronomy, and the other is to conduct spectroscopic observations of the Earth. PETREL is planned to be launched as part of the Japanese space agency JAXA's 2022 Innovative Satellite Technology Demonstration-3 mission.

Overview
PETREL's role differs depending on its position in orbit: while inside Earth's shadow it will conduct astronomical observations, and while outside it will function as an Earth observation satellite.

PETREL will conduct wide field observations in ultraviolet, which will work in tandem with ground-based observatories to study time-domain multi-messenger astronomy. PETREL is a pathfinder for the ULTRASAT mission.

As an Earth observation satellite, PETREL will perform multispectral observation of both the land and seas to acquire data for use in agriculture and aquaculture. PETREL's ocean observation will measure the level of plankton and nutrients in the waters, which the aquaculture industry will utilize to help ensure a stable amount of catches.

See also

References

External links
 Project PETREL -  Tokyo Institute of Technology
 PETREL

proposed spacecraft
satellites of Japan
space telescopes
ultraviolet telescopes